Pterolophia subalbofasciata is a species of beetle in the family Cerambycidae. It was described by E. Forrest Gilmour and Stephan von Breuning in 1963. It is known from Borneo.

References

subalbofasciata
Beetles described in 1963